Adrienne Wooten (born March 7, 1974) is an American politician who served as member of the Mississippi House of Representatives for the 71st district from 2008 to 2019.

References

1974 births
Living people
People from Riverside, California
Women state legislators in Mississippi
Democratic Party members of the Mississippi House of Representatives
African-American state legislators in Mississippi
21st-century American politicians
21st-century American women politicians
21st-century African-American women
21st-century African-American politicians
20th-century African-American people
20th-century African-American women